Sam L. Sibert (born February 11, 1949) is a retired American professional basketball player.  He was born in McCormick, South Carolina and went to Crane High School in Chicago. He played briefly in the NBA with the Kansas City-Omaha Kings, averaging 2.4 points per game in five games during the 1972-73 season.  Sibert attended Eastern Oklahoma State College then transferred to Texas Tech University in 1969 before attending Kentucky State University.  Sibert was taken in the second round of the 1972 NBA draft by the Cincinnati Royals.

References

NBA.com Playerfile

1949 births
Living people
Basketball players from Chicago
Basketball players from South Carolina
Forwards (basketball)
Junior college men's basketball players in the United States
Kansas City Kings draft picks
Kansas City Kings players
Kentucky State Thorobreds basketball players
People from McCormick, South Carolina
Texas Tech Red Raiders basketball players
American men's basketball players